Sirtich is a rural locality (a selo) in Tabasaransky District, Republic of Dagestan, Russia. The population was 3,976 as of 2010. There are 24 streets.

Geography 
Sirtich is located 40 km southeast of Khuchni (the district's administrative centre) by road. Gyukhryag and Syugyut are the nearest rural localities.

References 

Rural localities in Tabasaransky District